Rostros Ocultos is a Mexican rock-pop band founded in 1985, who were moderately well known in the 80s. It was part of the post-movement started by Caifanes, and it was one of the bands that followed its principles, along with Santa Sabina, Fobia, El Tri,  and Maná, among others.

Its biggest success was the 1989 single El Final. Its singer's voice is considered one of rock en español's most representative, along with that of Saúl Hernández of Caifanes, Enrique Bunbury and Gustavo Cerati of Soda Stereo.

History 

In 1984 Cala started a punk rock band called the Pills, with himself and Pablo Martinez on guitar, Quetzalcoatl Aviles on drums, and Victor Inda on bass.

Montana 
In 1985 in Guadalajara, two tapatío youths, young men from Guadalajara, began to make energetic rock in Spanish. Arturo Ybarra, then guitar player of the groups Mask and TRAX and Agustín Villa (Cala), singer for the Los Clips project and Rock'n Pills, formed a group that would reflect their lives, their dreams, their loves, their heartbreaks and their disappointments as young men. This new project was named Montana, after a brand of cigars. The magic of Montana was expressed in its first disc, 1985's Quiero más on the WEA label, showing a fresh style, light and enveloping, a disc with releases like Quiero más and Quisiera que estuvieras aquí.

The music of the period can be found on the 1984 Comrock WEA album, which featured Ritmo Peligroso, Kenny y los Eléctricos, Mask and Los Clips.

Rostros Ocultos 
With a new name in 1986, the band started over as Rostros Ocultos. 

They signed a contract with EMI to record Disparado in 1987, from which they released the singles Mujer desechable and El último adiós, then in 1989 put out Abre tu corazón. Here they covered the Los Clips single El final. This production had the participation of Alejandra Guzmán, Andrés Calamaro and Kenny, and they began to play across the country with much recognition. Then the group took a break and the leaders of the band decided to start separate projects. Arturo recorded a gospel disc titled Luz aquella, and Cala put out a solo project called Con huevos y cajeta (1994).
 
En 1997, at the request of label, they decided to get together again as Rostros Ocultos and put out Dame una razón. They recorded Disparado, Abre tu corazón, Músicos, poetas y locos and Dame una razón on the EMI label. With these productions, they left an indelible mark on rock en español.

In 2001, its fifteenth anniversary, the group decided to record 15 Celebración, a compilation of their best songs, for the Sony Music label. This celebration had the participation of 

On this album the group had the following lineup:
 Agustin Villa Cala – vocals 
 Arturo Ybarra – guitar and backup vocals 
 Gerardo Matuz – drums 
 Karlo Romero – percussion 
 Jorge Corrales – keyboard and 
 Alfonso Martinez – bass

The tour ended with a show in Guadalajara. They filled the Auditorio Benito Juárez with 15,000 people. Part of this celebration was the production of the video Dame una razón, directed by Sergio Ulloa, recognized photographer who went on to with René Castillo in the short film Hasta los huesos, which became a hit on the various video channels.

In 2002, based on the football career of Hugo Sánchez, they decided to compose a song titled Hugol and produced a video of it, produced and directed by a member of the band Karlo Romero, as a tribute to the best Mexican football player of all time. This release included an interactive CD, with highlights from the career of Hugo Sánchez and the history of Rostros Ocultos.

In 2003 with the experience of many years, Rostros Ocultos presented their new production on the Sony Music label, Renacer (to be reborn). With totally unreleased cuts, Renacer began a new cycle for the band, a new image, a rebirth. Containing only four live elements the powerful and strong lineup:
 Agustin Villa Cala (vocals) 
 Arturo Ybarra (guitar and backup vocals) 
 Karlo Romero (drum) and 
 Victor Hugo "Chumino" Guardado (bass) 
the group went on a large tour in and out of the country. The primary objective of the group was a message to all their fans and the general community about the importance of organ donation, to give live after life. So they included a song in this material titled Corazón about a little girl born with a very weak heart who is waiting for a heart transplant. Also, they added a sticker that promotes organ donation and an authorization card for those who are interested in becoming organ donors.

Alex González, the drummer for Maná, participated on the album, adding input to the song Ya no quiero verte más as did the maestro of rock en español Miguel Ríos, on a special version of Santo y diablo. The first single from the soundtrack of the film Santos diablos. This piece speaks of the duality of being human, of the discernment of good from evil. The video for this first single was produced by Praxis, a Mexican company specializing in 3D animation. It was recorded in Guadalajara, with post-production in Miami.

Their most recent production was filmed and recorded in the legendary Teatro Diana in Guadalajara and commemorates their 25-year career and lasting popularity. Participants in this production, titled 25 Aniversario, included their friends and musical colleagues: Jose Fors and Galileo Ochoa of (Cuca), Jaffo (Plastiko), Kenny Aviles, Jovito pantera and the disbanded tapatio group Poetas en el Exilio.

Members

Original lineup (1985) 

 Cala de Villa, vocals
 Arturo Ybarra, guitar
 Víctor Inda, bass
 Abraham Calleros, drums
 Andrés Franco, keyboard

Current lineup 

 Arturo Ybarra, guitar
 Cala Villa, vocals
 Bola Domene, drums
 Alfonso Martínez, bass

Former members 

 Javier Barragan Fonseca, bass
 Alex Gonzales Orco, drums – Azul Violeta
 César "Vampiro" López –   Jaguares
 Felipe Staiti – Enanitos Verdes
 Jorge Corrales, keyboards – Playa Limbo
 Carlos García, drums – Indp
 Chiquis, bass – Mama 
 Karlo Romero, drums –  Producer Negra Records
 Robert Monj, drums – Mentes secretas
 Abraham Calleros, drums – former member of Maná
 Angel Baillo – Playa Limbo
 Arturo "El limón", keyboards – Sussie 4
 Juan Maldonado Sinte – Ind
 Matus, drums – Ind
 Victor Hugo Guardado "Chumino", bass – Los afro brothers
 Andres Franco, keyboard
 Francisco Toyos, bass – 90-92/95-97
 Juan Carlos Barraza, guitar – Mexicali – Quererte mas 93–95
 Jaime Regueira, bass

Guest musicians 
 Andrés Franco, keyboards
 Juan Pablo Harfush, guitar
 Christian Gómez, drums
 Robert Monj, drums

Discography

Montana 
 Quiero Más WEA (1985)

Rostros Ocultos

Studio albums 
 1987: Disparado – EMI
 1989: Abre tu corazón – EMI
 1992: Divididos Rockotitlán
 1995: Músicos, poetas y locos – EMI
 1997: Dame una razón – EMI
 2001: 15 Celebración – Sony
 2004: Renacer – Sony
 2007: En vivo Hard Rock Live (DVD/CD) – Prodisc
 2009: Once : Once – Fonarte/JMV
 2013: 25 Aniversario – Fonarte Latino
 2016: Monstruos – Fonarte Latino
 2016: Rock sinfonico en tu Idioma – Sony/BMG

Individual discography 
Agustín Villa "Cala":
 Cala Con huevos y cajeta EMI 1994

Arturo Ybarra:
 Luz Aquella Destino la eternidad Rhema records 1997
 Luz Aquella Levanta tus alas Rhema records 2006
 Luz Aquella DVD en vivo HRL rhema records 2007
 Luz Aquella Dias de luz Rhema Records 2009
 Forseps V Cultura U.De G. 2010
 Opera Frankestein 2011
 Jose Fors Reproducciones volumen 1 – 2012
 Forseps 6 – 2013

Other former members

References

External links 
 Official website of Rostros Ocultos
 MySpace of Rostros Ocultos

Mexican rock music groups